Archaeopacha is a monotypic moth genus in the family Lasiocampidae. It was first described by Per Olof Christopher Aurivillius in 1925. Its only species, Archaeopacha obsoleta, was described in the same publication. It is found in the Democratic Republic of the Congo.

References

Lasiocampidae
Moth genera
Monotypic moth genera